Buccinaria urania is a species of sea snail, a marine gastropod mollusk in the family Raphitomidae.

Description
The length of the shell attains 23 mm, its diameter 11 mm.

The white ovately fusiform shell contains 10 whorls. In some of the upper whorls the upper margin just beneath the suture is also more or less nodose. The tubercles just above the suture are crossed by two or three sulci, so that each of them is tripartite or quadripartite. The oblong aperture has a sharp angle above and a narrow gutterlike, slightly recurved siphonal canal below. The outer lip is thin, the upper part gently curving.

Distribution
This marine species occurs off Southeast India, the Andamans and off the Philippines.

References

 Bouchet P. & Sysoev A. (1997) Revision of the Recent species of Buccinaria (Gastropoda: Conoidea), a genus of deep-water turrids of Tethyan origin. Venus, Japanese Journal of Malacology, 56:93-119

External links
 MNHN, Paris: specimen

urania
Gastropods described in 1906